Leonardo Pettinari (born 23 July 1986) is an Italian retired footballer and current manager.

Biography
Born in Prato, Tuscany, Pettinari started his career at regional capital Florence for Fiorentina. After spent 2 seasons at Primavera team. He joined Serie C1 side Sangiovannese in co-ownership deal in summer 2006. In July 2007, he was bought back by La Viola but sold to Serie A side Reggina.

He failed to play any match in Serie A before joined Lega Pro Prima Divisione side Ravenna in 2008-09 season.

In July 2009, he joined Serie B strugglers Cittadella in co-ownership deal, rejoined Tommaso Bellazzini, teammate at La Viola.

On 15 July 2010 he was sold to Atalanta. He retired in the 2012–2013 season because of heart problems.

In 2014, he became coach of lower league side La Querce.

References

External links
 Profile at Cittadella 
 Profile at AIC.Football.it 

Italian footballers
Serie B players
Serie A players
ACF Fiorentina players
Reggina 1914 players
Ravenna F.C. players
A.S. Cittadella players
A.S.D. Sangiovannese 1927 players
S.S.D. Varese Calcio players
Association football midfielders
People from Prato
1986 births
Living people
Sportspeople from the Province of Prato
Footballers from Tuscany